Chak 356 JB is a village near Gojra in Punjab, Pakistan.

References 

Populated places in Toba Tek Singh District